The World We Know may refer to:
 The World We Know (Ace Enders album)
 The World We Know (Stan Kenton album)

See also
 The World We Knew, a 1967 album by Frank Sinatra